Baranikha is the name of several inhabited localities in Russia:
Baranikha, Chukotka Autonomous Okrug, an urban locality (an urban-type settlement) in Chukotka Autonomous Okrug
Baranikha, Ivanovo Oblast, a rural locality (a village) in Ivanovo Oblast
Baranikha, name of several other rural localities